Gaertnera truncata is a species of plant in the family Rubiaceae. It is endemic to Mauritius.  Its natural habitat is subtropical or tropical dry forests.

References

truncata
Endemic flora of Mauritius
Critically endangered plants
Taxonomy articles created by Polbot